Picramnia, the bitterbushes, is a genus of plant considered to be in the family Picramniaceae, but sometimes placed in Simaroubaceae. The name is conserved against the genera Pseudo-brasilium Adans., and Tariri Aubl., both which have been rejected (nomen rejiciendum).

Selected species
     

Picramnia andrade-limae Pirani
Picramnia antidesma Sw.
Picramnia apetala Tul.
Picramnia bahiensis Turcz.
Picramnia bullata W.W.Thomas
Picramnia campestris Rizzini & Occhioni
Picramnia caracasana Engl.
Picramnia ciliata Mart.
Picramnia coccinea W.W.Thomas
Picramnia deflexa W.W.Thomas
Picramnia dictyoneura (Urb.) Urb. & Ekman
Picramnia dolichobotrya Diels
Picramnia elliptica Kuhlm. ex Pirani & W.W.Thomas
Picramnia emarginata Urb. & Ekman
Picramnia excelsa Kuhlm. ex Pirani
Picramnia ferrea Pirani & W.W.Thomas
Picramnia gardneri Planch.
Picramnia glazioviana Engl.
Picramnia gracilis Tul.
Picramnia grandifolia Engl.
Picramnia guerrerensis W.W.Thomas
Picramnia guianensis (Aubl.) Jans.-Jac.
Picramnia hirsuta W.W.Thomas
Picramnia juniniana J.F.Macbr.
Picramnia killipii J.F.Macbr.
Picramnia latifolia Tul.
Picramnia macrocarpa Urb. & Ekman
Picramnia magnifolia J.F.Macbr.
Picramnia matudae Lundell
Picramnia nuriensis Steyerm.
Picramnia oreadica Pirani
Picramnia parvifolia Engl.
Picramnia pentandra Sw.
Picramnia polyantha (Benth.) Planch.
Picramnia ramiflora Planch.
Picramnia regnellii Engl.
Picramnia reticulata Griseb.
Picramnia riedelii Regel & Rach
Picramnia sellowii Planch.
Picramnia sphaerocarpa Planch.
Picramnia spruceana Engl.
Picramnia teapensis Tul.
Picramnia thomasii Gonz.-Martínez & J.Jiménez Ram.
Picramnia villosa Rusby
Picramnia xalapensis Planch.

 List source :

See also
 Gumillea, for more information on this synonym of Picramnia.

References

External links
 
 

Picramniales
Flora of the Caribbean
Flora of Central America
Flora of North America
Flora of South America
Taxonomy articles created by Polbot
Taxa named by Olof Swartz